Act III: Life and Death is the third studio album by American rock band The Dear Hunter, released on June 23, 2009. According to lead vocalist Casey Crescenzo, it is the third part of a six-act story, following the original in 2006, Act I: The Lake South, the River North, and 2007's Act II: The Meaning of, and All Things Regarding Ms. Leading, and preceding Act IV: Rebirth in Reprise (2015). The album was produced by Casey Crescenzo and Andy Wildrick in the band's own studio in Providence, Rhode Island, with a number of musicians making guest appearances.

As of July 1, 2009, the album had peaked on the Billboard 200 at #182 (the first time a Dear Hunter album ever cracked the top 200), #14 on the Billboard Top Heatseakers, and #31 on Top Independent Albums.

Track listing

Deluxe edition
The band released a deluxe edition of the album in a DVD-sized case that contained an autographed poster, picture-postcards with the lyrics to each song, and a storybook of the band's previous full-length album Act II: The Meaning of, and All Things Regarding Ms. Leading, which was illustrated by artist Kent St. John. In addition, the album came with four bonus tracks. The deluxe edition was only available through preorder of the album while supplies lasted, but was also seen at the merchandise table during The Dear Hunter's tour with Kay Kay and His Weathered Underground and mewithoutYou.

Music video
The Dear Hunter, along with the help of artist Glenn Thomas, created an animated music video for their song "What It Means to Be Alone". Though the band still neglects to have an actual single, charting or otherwise, this is their second music video, the first being "The Church and the Dime" from their previous album.

Personnel
 Casey Crescenzo – vocals, piano, organ, synthesizer, guitar, bass, banjo, production, engineering
 Andy Wildrick – guitar, acoustic guitar, vocals, engineering
 Erick Serna – guitars, vocals
 Nick Crescenzo – drums, percussion, vocals
 Nate Patterson – bass
 Mike Watts - Mixing

Additional personnel
 Austin Hatch – clarinet, saxophone
 Pasquale Lanelli – saxophone
 Dave Calzone – trombone
 Andrew Mericle – trumpet
 Samantha Conway – French horn
 Charles Lidell – cello
 Angela Preston – violin, viola
 Mark Adelle – violin
 Lynn Mira – harp
 Mike Watts – mixing

References

2009 albums
The Dear Hunter albums
Concept albums
Rock operas
Triple Crown Records albums
Sequel albums